The women's 1500 meter at the 2013 KNSB Dutch Single Distance Championships took place in Heerenveen at the Thialf ice skating rink on Friday 9 November 2012. Although this tournament was held in 2012, it was part of the 2012–2013 speed skating season.

There were 24 participants.

Title holder was Ireen Wüst.

There was a qualification selection incentive for the next following 2012–13 ISU Speed Skating World Cup tournaments.

Overview

Result

Draw

Source:

References

Single Distance Championships
2013 Single Distance
World